Some of the finite structures considered in graph theory have names, sometimes inspired by the graph's topology, and sometimes after their discoverer. A famous example is the Petersen graph, a concrete graph on 10 vertices that appears as a minimal example or counterexample in many different contexts.

Individual graphs

Highly symmetric graphs

Strongly regular graphs
The strongly regular graph on v vertices and rank k is usually denoted srg(v,k,λ,μ).

Symmetric graphs
A symmetric graph is one in which there is a symmetry (graph automorphism) taking any ordered pair of adjacent vertices to any other ordered pair; the Foster census lists all small symmetric 3-regular graphs. Every strongly regular graph is symmetric, but not vice versa.

Semi-symmetric graphs

Graph families

Complete graphs
The complete graph on  vertices is often called the -clique and usually denoted , from German komplett.

Complete bipartite graphs
The complete bipartite graph is usually denoted . For  see the section on star graphs. The graph  equals the 4-cycle  (the square) introduced below.

Cycles
The cycle graph on  vertices is called the n-cycle and usually denoted . It is also called a cyclic graph, a polygon or the n-gon. Special cases are  the triangle , the square , and then several with Greek naming pentagon , hexagon , etc.

Friendship graphs
The friendship graph Fn can be constructed by joining n copies of the cycle graph C3 with a common vertex.

Fullerene graphs
In graph theory, the term fullerene refers to any 3-regular, planar graph with all faces of size 5 or 6 (including the external face). It follows from Euler's polyhedron formula, V – E + F = 2 (where V, E, F indicate the number of vertices, edges, and faces), that there are exactly 12 pentagons in a fullerene and h = V/2 – 10 hexagons. Therefore V = 20 + 2h; E = 30 + 3h. Fullerene graphs are the Schlegel representations of the corresponding fullerene compounds.

An algorithm to generate all the non-isomorphic fullerenes with a given number of hexagonal faces has been developed by G. Brinkmann and A. Dress. G. Brinkmann also provided a freely available implementation, called fullgen.

Platonic solids
The complete graph on four vertices forms the skeleton of the tetrahedron, and more generally the complete graphs form skeletons of simplices. The hypercube graphs are also skeletons of higher-dimensional regular polytopes.

Truncated solids

Snarks
A snark is a bridgeless cubic graph that requires four colors in any proper edge coloring. The smallest snark is the Petersen graph, already listed above.

Star
A star Sk is the complete bipartite graph K1,k. The star S3 is called the claw graph.

Wheel graphs
The wheel graph Wn is a graph on n vertices constructed by connecting a single vertex to every vertex in an (n − 1)-cycle.

References 

Named Graphs

Image galleries